In British rugby league, winning The Double refers to winning the Super League, the country's highest tier league competition, (Rugby Football League Championship First Division before 1996), and the Challenge Cup in one season. Nine teams have won the double, the first being Broughton Rangers in 1902. Wigan Warriors are the most successful side having won a record 7 doubles.

Men's doubles

Bradford Bulls

2003
Bradford Bulls achieved only one double in 2003 beating Leeds Rhinos 22–20 in the Challenge Cup and then going on to beat Wigan Warriors 25–12 in the Grand Final. They also completed their only treble this year.

Broughton Rangers

1901–02
Broughton Rangers were the first team to record a league and cup double by finishing top of the Rugby Football League Championship With 43 points and beating Salford Red Devils 25–0 at Rochdale in the Challenge Cup. This would be their only double before they disbanded In 1955.

Halifax

1902–03
Halifax won their only double the year after Broughton won the first double in 1901–02. They finished top of the league with 49 points and beat Salford Red Devils 7–0 at Headingley Stadium. This was their only double recorded.

Huddersfield Giants

1912–13
Huddersfield Giants won their first of two doubles in 1913, finishing top of the league on points difference with Wigan Warriors and then went on to defeat them in the Championship Final 29–2. They completed their double by beating Warrington Wolves 9–5 in the Challenge Cup.

1914–15
Huddersfield went on to win their second double by beating Leeds in the Championship Final 35–2 and won the Challenge Cup beating St. Helens 37–3.

Hunslet

1907–08
In Hunslet's most famous season where they won All Four Cups they also achieved the double beating Oldham 12–7 in the Championship Final and Beating Hull F.C. 14–0 In the Challenge Cup, which was their first cup final.

Leeds Rhinos

2015
Leeds won their first double in 2015 beating Hull Kingston Rovers in the Challenge Cup Final by a record winning margin of 50–0. They also won the treble this year after they beat Wigan Warriors 22–20 in the Super League Grand Final to become the first Leeds team to win the Cup and Grand Final in the same season.

St Helens

1965–66
St. Helens claimed their first double in 1966 beating Halifax 35–12 in the Championship Final and beat Wakefield Trinity 10–0 in the Challenge Cup final. This would be the first of three doubles won by the Saints.

1996
This was the first double won in the Super League era. St Helens finished top of the league and were crowned Champions of the first Super League season. They beat Bradford Bulls 40–32 in the Challenge Cup at Wembley.

2006
St Helens became the sixth team to win All Four Cups this year. They beat Huddersfield 42–12 in the Challenge Cup final and went on to beat Hull F.C. 26–4 in the Grand Final.

2021
St Helens won their fourth double in 2021, beating Catalans Dragons 12–10 in the grand final to successfully retaining their title and claim a 3rd title in a row.

Swinton Lions

1927–28
Swinton Lions Won their only double in 1928 beating Featherstone Rovers 11–0 in the Championship Final as well as finishing top of the league during the regular season. They Beat Warrington Wolves 5-3 in the Challenge Cup final to complete their first double.

Warrington Wolves

1953–54
Warringtons only double came in 1954 when they beat Oldham 7–3 in the Championship Final and beat Halifax 8–4 in the Challenge Cup replay at Odsal.

Wigan Warriors

1989–90 to 1995–96
Wigan Warriors made history in the 1990s by winning a record 6 consecutive doubles between 1989–90 to 1995–96, the last season of winter rugby league before the introduction of Super League.

2013
Wigan won their seventh double in 2013 by beating Hull F.C. 16–0 in the Challenge Cup final. They then went on to beat Warrington Wolves 30–16 in the Grand Final to become only the third team in the Super League era to win the double.

Winners by club

Women's Double

Thatto Heath Crusaders
Thatto Heath Crusaders, won the double in 2016 as part of the now defunct Women's Rugby League competition.

Bradford Bulls
Bradford won the double in the inaugural Women's Super League season.

Winners by club

In France
Similar to the UK, the double in French rugby league is achieved by winning the primary league competition, the Elite One Championship (French Rugby League Championship before 2002), and the primary cup competition, the Lord Derby Cup. The teams that have achieved this are as follows:

Winners by club

See also

The Treble (rugby league)
All Four Cups

Notes

References

External links

Challenge Cup
Super League
Rugby Football League Championship
Rugby league trophies and awards
Rugby league competitions in the United Kingdom